Koh e Hindaki. It is located near Bagrami District in Kabul Province.

References

Photos
 Phototeca Afghanica
 Le palais jahan numa transformé par l’émir Habibullah à hendaki
 Chehel Sotoun Kabul
 Chehel Sotoun Kabul
 Hendaki Jahan-numa Palace Hindaki, the Emir's residence, Kabul 

Hindu Kush
Two-thousanders of Afghanistan
Landforms of Kabul Province